Pengenffordd is a village located in the community of Talgarth, in the Brecknockshire area of south Powys. It is 33.4 miles (53.7 km) from Cardiff and 135.4 miles (217.9 km) from London.

The village is located approximately 8 miles east of Brecon, on the slopes of the Black Mountains. It lies on the A470 road, between Talgarth to the north and Tretower to the south.

Politics 
Pengefnffordd is represented in the Senedd by James Evans and the Member of Parliament is Fay Jones, both of the Conservative Party.

References

Villages in Powys